Room at the Bottom is a British comedy television series which originally aired as a pilot in 1966 on the Comedy Playhouse and a single series of seven episodes on BBC 1 the following year. Set in the maintenance department of a large company tower block, it was the first sitcom by the writing team of John Esmonde and Bob Larbey. All episodes from this series are currently believed to be lost due to wiping.

Cast

Main
 Kenneth Connor as Gus Fogg
Deryck Guyler as Mr. Powell
 Gordon Rollings as Happy Brazier
 Kenny Lynch as Horace Robinson
 Brian Wilde as Mr. Salisbury
 John Horsley as Lord Percy

Guest
 Patrick Newell as Cyril Culpepper
 Yvonne Antrobus as Betty
 Jack Bligh as Uncle Percy
 Richard Coleman as Dillington
 Frances Collins as  Miss Edgeworthy
 Eric Dodson as Director
 John Dunbar as  Mr. Walpole
 Janina Faye as Gloria
 Wendy Gifford as Miss Bryant
 Bill Horsley as Slocombe
 Len Jones as Boy
 John Scott Martin as  Morris Dancer
 Henry McGee as Mr. Hopkins 
 Geraldine Newman as Miss Mandrake
 Richard O'Sullivan as The Honourable Tarquin
 Lynn Rainbow as Wendy
 Colin Rix as Hawkins
 Jo Rowbottom as Millie
 Bill Shine as Club Steward 
 Thorley Walters as Lord Fareham

References

Bibliography
 Perry, Christopher . The British Television Pilot Episodes Research Guide 1936-2015. 2015.

External links
 

1967 British television series debuts
1967 British television series endings
1960s British comedy television series
BBC television sitcoms
English-language television shows